Stratmoor (commonly known as Stratmoor Hills) is an unincorporated community and a census-designated place (CDP) located in and governed by El Paso County, Colorado, United States. The CDP is a part of the Colorado Springs, CO Metropolitan Statistical Area. The population of the Stratmoor CDP was 6,900 at the United States Census 2010. The Colorado Springs post office (Zip Codes 80906, 80910, and 80911) serves the area.

History

Partial annexation by the City of Fountain
A portion of the Stratmoor CDP was annexed by the City of Fountain in 2014. Specifically, the area annexed was a 60-acre parcel just to the west of Interstate 25 at Exit 135 and north of South Academy Boulevard. The annexed land now includes a Walmart store, a Sam's Club, and a strip mall.

Geography

Demographics

Education
The Harrison School District 2 serves Stratmoor Hills.

See also

Outline of Colorado
Index of Colorado-related articles
State of Colorado
Colorado cities and towns
Colorado census designated places
Colorado counties
El Paso County, Colorado
List of statistical areas in Colorado
Front Range Urban Corridor
South Central Colorado Urban Area
Colorado Springs, CO Metropolitan Statistical Area

References

External links

The Stratmoor Hills Neighborhood Association
Stratmoor Hills Water District & Stratmoor Hills Sanitation District
Stratmoor Hills Fire Protection District
Harrison School District Two
Stratmoor Hills Elementary School
El Paso County website

Census-designated places in El Paso County, Colorado
Census-designated places in Colorado